Asplenium schweinfurthii is a species of fern in the family Aspleniaceae. It is endemic to Yemen.  Its natural habitats are subtropical or tropical dry forests and subtropical or tropical dry shrubland. It is threatened by habitat loss.

References

schweinfurthii
Endemic flora of Socotra
Ferns of Asia
Vulnerable flora of Asia
Taxonomy articles created by Polbot
Taxa named by John Gilbert Baker